National Route 331 is a national highway of Japan connecting Itoman, Okinawa and Ōgimi, Okinawa in Japan, with a total length of 150.4 km (93.45 mi).

Route description
A section of National Route 331 in Nago is a musical road.

References

National highways in Japan
Roads in Okinawa Prefecture
Musical roads in Japan